Indian Defence Accounts Service (IDAS) (Hindi: भारतीय रक्षा लेखा सेवा) is a Central Group 'A' Civil Service of the Republic of India established to provide Financial Advice, Payment, Accounts and Audit services to the Defence Services i.e. Indian Armed Forces (viz Army, Navy, Air Force and Coast Guard) and other allied organisations viz. Ordnance Factories, Military Engineer Services, Border Roads Organisation, Defence Research and Development Organisation etc.

IDAS officers are Group-A gazetted civilian officers under Ministry of Defence, Government of India. They are primarily recruited through the Civil Services Examination conducted by the Union Public Service Commission (UPSC) every year. . The cadre controlling authority (CCA) of IDAS is the CGDA. The total number of IDAS officers is approximately 550.
The Controller General of Defence Accounts(CGDA) is the service head of the Indian Defence Accounts Service and also heads the Defence Accounts Department.

Profile 
The IDAS officers form the management cadre of the Defence Accounts Department(DAD). The Defence Accounts Department has a history of more than two hundred and fifty years, tracing its origin to the year 1750, having been established to look after the Pay & Accounts of Military Services in India. Presently, it is mandated to provide financial advice, payments, accounts and internal audit to the three Defence Services(Army, Navy, Air Force), Defence Research and Development Organisation (DRDO),Ordnance Factories, Indian Coast Guard and other inter-services organisations. The concurrence of concerned financial advisors from the IDAS cadre at various echelons is needed before any expenditure is undertaken by these organisations under the administrative control of Ministry of Defence.

About Defence Finance 
There is a separate Finance Division of the Raksha Mantralaya (Ministry of Defence) for dealing with all defence matters having a financial bearing. The head of this division is the Financial Adviser (Defence Services).

With a view to ensuring greater efficiency in administration and quicker disposal of the cases, Ministry of Defence has been delegated enhanced financial powers in regard to expenditure met from the Defence Services Estimates. In matters within the delegated powers of the Ministry of Defence, Financial Adviser(Defence Services) or authorised Representatives of Finance Division are to be consulted before exercise of financial powers. The Finance Division prepares the Defence Budget and the Civil estimates for the Civilian Establishments of the Ministry of Defence. It also furnishes the Heads of the Branches of the Armed Forces Headquarters and Heads of Civilian Deptts./Organisations with all information necessary to enable them to discharge their financial responsibilities in respect of the grants allotted to them and advises them in regard to the preparation of proposals and the disposal of financial business generally. Finance Division is also fully associated with formulation and implementation of Defence Plans.

Training, initial appointments and peculiar position
The officers recruited to IDAS are offered elaborate training at various centres. First, a foundation training along with the All India Services at the Lal Bahadur Shastri National Academy of Administration (Mussoorie) for four months is imparted. After this, Induction Training is imparted at National Academy of Defence Financial Management, Pune. This is followed by a Professional Training Course at National Institute of Financial Management (Faridabad). Finally, there is a Departmental Training at National Academy Of Defence Financial Management at Pune. The entire training(including on-job training) lasts for a period of two years. After this, on passing the Departmental Examination, the probationers are confirmed into the Junior Time Scale grade. 

The officers are then posted as either the assistant CDA or deputy IFA (Integrated Financial Adviser). The IFAs and CDAs/ PCDAs hold very important and critical responsibilities vis-a-vis the expenditure of the biggest budget for any Ministry under Government of India - the Ministry of Defence. They're part of executive machinery in their role as IFAs and help plan judicious use of allotted money's to their zone/ command/ area of responsibility, therefore being incessantly involved in procurement, provisioning (Tendering), financial-logistical planning etc. 

An important aspect of IDAS is their fast pace of promotions, that is one of the fastest among other equivalent -Group-'A' Civil Services. They become Joint CDA/ Joint IFA at about 9 years of service. Joint  CDA is equivalent to Colonel rank of the Indian Army.

They become CDA at around 18 years of service. CDA is equivalent to Income Tax/ GST Commissioner/ IG of police/ Secretary to state government in an IAS cadre/ Joint Secretary to Government of India. IDAS officer's have been holding important deputation posts under Government of India.

See also

 Civil Services of India
 All India Service

References 

Ministry of Defence (India)
Central Civil Services (India)
Organisations based in Delhi